Joerg Stadler is a German actor. He played a captured German soldier, nicknamed "Steamboat Willie", in Saving Private Ryan (1998), and starred in Miguel Sapochnik's short film The Dreamer in 2001.

Filmography

References

External links

Living people
German male television actors
German male film actors
1961 births